The year 696 BC was a year of the pre-Julian Roman calendar. In the Roman Empire, it was known as year 58 Ab urbe condita . The denomination 696 BC for this year has been used since the early medieval period, when the Anno Domini calendar era became the prevalent method in Europe for naming years.

Events

By place

Europe 
 Cimmerian forces begin a conquest of Phrygia (modern Turkey), having failed in their efforts to defeat the Assyrians and moved into Anatolia.
 Possible migration of the Armenians (approximate date).
 Pantacles of Athens wins the stadion race at the 21st Olympic Games.

Asia 
Zhou Zhuang Wang becomes king of the Zhou Dynasty of China.

Births

Deaths

References